The spiny oak slug (Euclea delphinii) is the larval form (caterpillar) of a moth in the family Limacodidae.

Life cycle
There is one generation a year in the most of the northern parts of its range, with caterpillars seen from late June to October . Two generations or more from Missouri south.

Egg
Eggs are laid singly or in small clusters on leaves .

Larva

The larva is flattened and ovoid in outline, with spiny tubercules along the back and sides. These are venomous, producing symptoms in humans that vary from mild itching and burning to more serious reactions that require medical attention . The sides have craters ringed with black or white along them.  In the final instar they usually have two to four sets of black hairs at the tail end, that can fall off, called 'caltrop' spines after the Roman defensive weapons.  Colourful, but the colours  vary enormously . Like all limacodids, the legs are shortened and the prolegs are reduced to suction cups. Maximum length, 20 mm .

Pupa
Pupates in a cup-shaped cocoon with a circular escape hatch.

Adult

The small (1 cm) moth is 'hairy' and brown, with green patches on the upper wing. The underwing is a paler grey-brown.

Food plants
Eats a variety of deciduous trees and shrubs, not limited to: apple, ash, basswood, beech, birch, blueberry, cherry, chestnut, hackberry, hickory, maple, oak, poplar, sycamore and willow .

References

External links
 Adult @ Maryland moths
 BugGuide images of adults and larval variations

Limacodidae
Moths described in 1832